Comoé is one of the 45 provinces of Burkina Faso, located in its Cascades Region. The capital of Comoé is Banfora. The population of Comoé was 632,695 in 2019.

Comoé is divided into 9 departments:

See also
Regions of Burkina Faso
Provinces of Burkina Faso
Departments of Burkina Faso

References

 
Provinces of Burkina Faso